Janice Cooper (17 February 1940 – 28 February 2002) was an Australian athlete. She competed in the women's high jump at the 1956 Summer Olympics.

References

1940 births
2002 deaths
Athletes (track and field) at the 1956 Summer Olympics
Australian female high jumpers
Olympic athletes of Australia
Place of birth missing